Polly Frame  is a Scottish actress who was born in Edinburgh, Scotland and is best known to children as Pinky Pinkerton, the hyperactive sports announcer on Disney Channel's pre-school television series Bunnytown.
  
She moved to Galashiels as a child, then to London after spending a year backpacking through India.  Among her TV shows and films are Meet the Magoons and Half Light. A graduate of Bristol University and its Old Vic Theatre, Frame appeared in a modernized version of William Shakespeare's Macbeth.

References

Living people
Year of birth missing (living people)
Actresses from Edinburgh
People from Galashiels
Scottish television actresses
Scottish stage actresses